Cornelius James Pelly, CMG, OBE (8 April 1908 – 1985), was an Irish-born colonial official and diplomat.

Pelly was the eldest son of Hyacinth Albert Pelly and Charity Maria Matthews of Heronsbrook, County Galway. 

Pelly was educated at Clongowes Wood College and Trinity College Dublin, from which he received a B.A. in 1928.

He joined Indian Civil Service in 1931, becoming a member of the Indian Political Service in 1927 and a member of Her Majesty's Diplomatic Service from 1947 to 1955. During this time he served as Political Agent in Bahrain (1947–1952) and Kuwait (1952–1955). From 1955 to 1956 he was in the service of Abdullah III Al-Salim Al-Sabah.

Pelly was made a Member of the Order of the British Empire in 1944. In 1952 he became a Companion of the Order of St Michael and St George.

He married Una Patricia O'Shea of Lismore, County Waterford on 5 October  1949 they had 2 children, Laura (born 1952) and Peter (born 1957).

External links
 Copy of confirmation of arms to Cornelius James Pelly, Political Officer at Sharjah Fort in Arabia, eldest son of Hyacinth Albert Pelly of City of Dublin and of a family out of Galway, 21 Dec. 1940.
 Bahrain at WorldStatesmen.org
 Cornelius James Pelly interviewed by de Caro and Jordan on working in the Indian Civil Service and Indian Political Service on 15-02-78.

References

 The Landed Gentry of Ireland, Sir Bernard Burke (4th edition), London, 1958, p. 566.
 Portumna Priory Inscriptions, Adrian James Martyn, in The Septs volume 29 no. 4, Minnesota, October 2008.

Irish colonial officials
People from County Galway
British people in colonial India
1908 births
1985 deaths
Alumni of Trinity College Dublin
People educated at Clongowes Wood College
Indian Political Service officers
Members of HM Diplomatic Service
20th-century British diplomats